Aleksandr Pletnev (born 1948) is a retired Russian swimmer who won a gold medal in the 4×200 m freestyle relay at the 1966 European Aquatics Championships, setting a new European record; individually, he won a bronze medal in the 1500 m freestyle event. He also won three national titles in the 400 m (1966) and 1500 m (1965, 1966) freestyle.

References

1948 births
Living people
Russian male swimmers
Russian male freestyle swimmers
Soviet male swimmers
European Aquatics Championships medalists in swimming